Dean Rhoads is a former Republican member of the Nevada Senate, representing the Northern Nevada District (map) from 1984 until 2012. Previously he served in the Nevada Assembly from 1976 through 1982.  In October 2010, Senator Rhoads broke with the Republican establishment to endorse Harry Reid over Sharron Angle in that year's Senate Race.

He was on the board of directors of the American Legislative Exchange Council (ALEC), a conservative lobbying group.

Jon Ralston, Nevada's leading political journalist, described Rhoads as a "consummate rural lawmaker", and "one of the most principled in history".

Personal information
Rhoads was born in Tonasket, Washington.

Family
Rhoads is married to his wife Sharon and together they have 2 children: Shammy, Chandra.

Education
Rhoads obtained his BS in Agriculture Business Management from California State Polytechnic College.

Organizations
Dean Rhoads is a member of many organizations which include:
Director of the American Legislative Exchange Council
Member of the Nevada Cattlemens Association
Member of the Nevada Taxpayers Association
Member of the Rotary Club

References

External links
Nevada State Legislature - Senator Dean A. Rhoads official government website
Project Vote Smart - Senator Dean A. Rhoads (NV) profile
Follow the Money - Dean A Rhoads
2006 2004 2000 1996 1992 campaign contributions

Republican Party members of the Nevada Assembly
Republican Party Nevada state senators
1935 births
Living people
People from Tonasket, Washington
American cattlemen